Lemuel Hopkins (June 19, 1750 – April 14, 1801) was an American poet and physician who was a member of the Hartford Wits, a group of literary satirists active in the late eighteenth century. A politically conservative Federalist, he coauthored The Anarchiad (1786–1787), a lengthy satiric poem critical of popular democracy and of the Articles of Confederation. His fellow authors on the poem were three other leading Wits: David Humphreys, Joel Barlow, and John Trumbull. Hopkins practiced medicine in Litchfield and Hartford and received an honorary Master of Arts degree from Yale University in 1784.

Hopkins died of pneumonia and was interred at Hartford's Ancient Burying Ground.

References

External links 

 The Anarchiad: A New England Poem - full text via the Internet Archive

1750 births
1801 deaths
People from Waterbury, Connecticut
People from Hartford, Connecticut
Epic poets
Hartford Wits
Poets from Connecticut
18th-century American poets
18th-century American male writers
American male poets
Physicians from Connecticut
Deaths from pneumonia in Connecticut